A Boston cream pie is a cake with a cream filling. The dessert acquired its name when cakes and pies were cooked in the same pans, and the words were used interchangeably. In the late 19th century, this type of cake was variously called a "cream pie", a "chocolate cream pie", or a "custard cake".

History
It is claimed to be created in 1856 by Armenian-French chef Mossburg Sanzian at the Parker House Hotel in Boston. A direct descendant of earlier cakes known as American pudding-cake pie and Washington pie, the dessert was referred to as chocolate cream pie, Parker House chocolate cream pie, and finally Boston cream pie on Parker House's menus.  The cake consisted of two layers of French butter sponge cake filled with thick custard and brushed with a rum syrup; its side was coated with the same custard overlaid with toasted sliced almonds, and the top coated with chocolate fondant. While other custard cakes may have existed at that time, baking chocolate as a coating was a new process, making it unique and a popular choice on the menu.

The name "chocolate cream pie" first appeared in the 1872 Methodist Almanac.  An early printed use of the term "Boston cream pie" occurred in the Granite Iron Ware Cook Book, printed in 1878. The earliest known recipe for the modern variant was printed in Miss Parloa's Kitchen Companion in 1887 as "chocolate cream pie".

Boston cream pie is the official dessert of Massachusetts, declared as such on December 12, 1996.

Variations
A Boston cream doughnut is a Berliner filled with vanilla custard or crème pâtissière and topped with icing made from chocolate.

The Taiwanese version of the Boston cream pie is a chiffon cake which does not include chocolate.

See also

 List of American desserts
 List of cakes
 List of regional dishes of the United States

References

Further reading

External links
 
 "Has Boston Cream Pie Been Manipulated Beyond Recognition? It's a Question with Many Layers." by Kara Baskin, The Boston Globe
 "How Boston Cream Pie Changed Americans’ Relationship With Chocolate" by Atlas Obscura

American cakes
Chocolate desserts
Custard desserts
Layer cakes
Massachusetts cuisine
Symbols of Massachusetts